Cheryomushki or Cheremushki may refer to:
Cheryomushki District, a district in South-Western Administrative Okrug of the federal city of Moscow, Russia
Cheryomushki (Moscow tram), a tramway in Moscow, Russia
Cheremushki, Kyrgyzstan, a village in Nooken District of Jalal-Abad Province in Kyrgyzstan
Cheremushki, Russia (Cheryomushki), several inhabited localities in Russia

See also
Moscow, Cheryomushki, a 1958 operetta by Dmitri Shostakovich
Novye Cheryomushki (Moscow Metro), a station of the Moscow Metro in Moscow, Russia